Mike Holcomb is an American politician and member of the Arkansas House of Representatives representing District 10 since January 14, 2013. Initially a Democrat, on August 20, 2015, he announced he was switching to the Republican Party.

Education
Holcomb graduated from Southern Baptist College.

Elections
2012 With Representative Sheilla Lampkin redistricted to District 9, Holcomb placed first in the three-way May 22, 2012 Democratic Primary with 1,814 votes (41.1%) won the June 22 runoff election with 1,649 votes (52.9%), and won the November 6, 2012 General election with 5,813 votes (55.3%) against Republican nominee Charles Roberts.

References

External links
Official page at the Arkansas House of Representatives

Mike Holcomb at Ballotpedia
Mike Holcomb at OpenSecrets

Place of birth missing (living people)
Year of birth missing (living people)
Living people
Arkansas Democrats
Arkansas Republicans
Members of the Arkansas House of Representatives
Politicians from Pine Bluff, Arkansas
21st-century American politicians